The following is a list of stadiums in Japan, ordered by capacity. Currently all stadiums with a capacity of 10,000 or more are included.

See also
List of Asian stadiums by capacity

References

Japan

Stadiums
Stadiums